Justo Tejada Martínez (6 January 1933 – 31 January 2021) was a Spanish footballer who played as a forward. He was capped by Spain on 8 occasions, scoring 4 goals. He died on 31 January 2021.

Career
Born in Barcelona, Catalonia, Tejada began playing football with the youth side of CE Europa. He played professionally with FC Barcelona, where he won La Liga and the Copa del Rey.

Honours
Barcelona
Inter-Cities Fairs Cup: 1955–58, 1958–60
Spanish League: 1958–59, 1959–60
Spanish Cup: 1956–57, 1958–59

Real Madrid
Spanish League: 1961–62, 1962–63
Spanish Cup: 1961–62

References

External links
 
 National team data 
 
 FC Barcelona archives 
 FC Barcelona profile

1933 births
2021 deaths
Spanish footballers
Association football forwards
La Liga players
Real Murcia players
FC Barcelona players
Real Madrid CF players
RCD Espanyol footballers
Spain B international footballers
Spain international footballers
Footballers from Barcelona
CD Condal players
Catalonia international footballers
UEFA Champions League top scorers